Sabu may refer to:

Film and comics
Sabu, Japanese name of 1966 Speed Racer's mechanic in original manga and its anime adaptation
Sabu, 1971 character in Chacha Chaudhary Indian comic books
Sabu (film), 2002 Japanese period drama directed by Takashi Miike

Geography
Sabu-Jaddi, Rock Art site in Northern Sudan containing hundreds of Neolithic-era rock panels
Sabu, Sudan, Northern village near Rock Art site of Sabu-Jaddi
Sabu, Iran, village in Sistan and Baluchestan Province
Sabu, island in Eastern Indonesia, more commonly referenced as Savu

People
 Sabu (ca. 3000 BC), son of Egyptian pharaoh Anedjib
Sabu also called Kem
Sabu also called Ibebi
Sabu also called Tjety
Sabu (actor), (1924–1963), Indian-American film personality
Sabu Martinez (1930–1979), American conguero and percussionist
Sabu the Wildman (1945–2007), American Samoan wrestler, a/k/a Cocoa Samoa
Paul Sabu (born 1951), American bandleader, son of above actor
Mohamad Sabu (born 1954), Malaysian legislator and Minister of Defense, a/k/s Mat Sabu
Sabu Cyril (born 1962), Indian film industry art director
Sabu (director) (born 1964), Japanese filmmaker and actor
Sabu (wrestler) (born 1964), American hardcore independent
Dany "Sabu" Sabourin (born 1980), Canadian ice hockey goaltender
Sabu (hacktivist) (born 1983), American computer hacker, co-founder of LulzSec

Other
Sabu language, spoken on Indonesian island of Savu
Sabu-sabu, Indonesian name for methamphetamine